From All of Us to All of You is an animated television Christmas special, produced by Walt Disney Productions and first presented on December 19, 1958 on ABC as part of the Walt Disney Presents anthology series. Hosted by Jiminy Cricket along with Mickey Mouse and Tinker Bell, the special combines newly produced animation with clips from vintage animated Disney shorts and feature films, presented to the viewer as "Christmas cards" from the various characters starring in each one.

Starting in 1963 and continuing through the 1970s, re-airings of the special would include preview footage of the studio's new or upcoming feature films. Beginning in 1983, it was expanded to 90 minutes and retitled A Disney Channel Christmas for airing on cable television's The Disney Channel. A home video version of the special, retitled Jiminy Cricket's Christmas, appeared on VHS, Betamax, and laserdisc in 1986.

The show has been shown infrequently in the US in recent years, but in the Nordic countries (Sweden, Finland, Denmark, Norway and Iceland) the show has been broadcast every year since 1959, and has become a holiday classic. Ratings show that around 40% of all Swedes watch it on Christmas Eve, the record (in 1997) being just over half the population.

This special has yet to see a DVD release.

Regional variations and local cultural significance

United States 
In the US, the show originally aired on ABC and occasionally afterwards on NBC. The original version included Walt Disney's introduction where he has been "cricket-sized", because, as Mickey and Jiminy would say, Christmas is bigger than all of them. The American version has not been shown on network television since 1980.

The original American version features the following shorts:
Santa's Workshop (1932)
Toy Tinkers (1949)

As well as clips from the following feature films, labeled in the special as "Memorable Moments":
Peter Pan – "You Can Fly!"
Bambi – Bambi and Thumper ice skating
Pinocchio – "I've Got No Strings"
Lady and the Tramp – "Bella Notte"
Cinderella – "The Work Song" / "A Dream Is a Wish Your Heart Makes"
Snow White and the Seven Dwarfs – "The Silly Song"

The special ends with Jiminy Cricket sharing his memorable moment, his song "When You Wish Upon a Star" (from Pinocchio), which he states "symbolizes faith, hope and all the things that Christmas stands for".

Starting in 1963 and continuing through the 1970s, all of the scenes with Walt and Tinker Bell's intros, as well as Santa's Workshop, were replaced by a teaser for Disney's new or upcoming feature films, including The Sword in the Stone (1963), The Jungle Book (1967), The Aristocats (1970), Robin Hood (1973) and Pete's Dragon (1977). The 1979 broadcast aired the 1951 Donald Duck/Chip 'n' Dale short Corn Chips, and the Aristocats returned in 1980 to promote the cartoon's re-release.

Denmark 

In Denmark, the show is called Disneys Juleshow: Fra alle os til alle jer ("Disney's Christmas Show: From All of Us to All of You") and is broadcast every Christmas Eve at 4 PM on DR1. It is narrated by Danish actor Ove Sprogøe who does the Danish voice of Jiminy Cricket. Clips from feature films are voiced in Danish while shorts are in English with Danish subtitles.

The Danish version features the following shorts:
Pluto's Christmas Tree (1952)
Donald's Snow Fight (1942)

As well as clips from the following feature films:
Snow White and the Seven Dwarfs
Lady and the Tramp
Bambi
Pinocchio
The Aristocats
Peter Pan
Cinderella

It ends with Bjørn Tidmand singing "When You Wish upon a Star" in Danish ("Når Du Ser et Stjerneskud") and a sneak peek of either an upcoming or a clip from a recently released Disney movie.

Finland 
In Finland, this show is called Samu Sirkan joulutervehdys, ("Jiminy Cricket's Christmas Greeting") and it is shown every Christmas Eve evening on MTV3.

The Finnish version features clips from the following shorts:
Pluto's Christmas Tree (1952)
The Clock Watcher (1945)
The Small One (1978)

As well as clips from the following feature films:
The Three Caballeros
Lady and the Tramp
Pinocchio
Peter Pan
Cinderella

A special "surprise" clip (from a recent or upcoming Disney feature premiere) is dubbed in Finnish but everything else is in English, with Finnish subtitles.

Norway 
In Norway, the show is called Donald Duck og vennene hans ("Donald Duck and his friends") on NRK and Disneys julekavalkade (Disney's Christmas Cavalcade) on TV Norge in 2003, and it is shown every Christmas Eve afternoon on NRK1. Most of the shorts are shown in their original English-speaking versions, with Norwegian subtitles.

The following shorts are usually shown, in integral or edited format:

Santa's Workshop
Clown of the Jungle
Pluto's Christmas Tree
Mickey's Trailer
Ferdinand the Bull

These feature films are represented through important scenes:

Snow White and the Seven Dwarfs
Bambi
Cinderella
Lady and the Tramp
The Jungle Book

Sweden 
In Sweden, the show is called Kalle Anka och hans vänner önskar God Jul ("Donald Duck and His Friends Wish You a Merry Christmas"). It is broadcast on SVT1 at 3:05p.m. as part of the channel's traditional Christmas Eve programming, which features a live host between programmes, a role closely associated with Arne Weise, who is the only host to have featured more than three times (22 appearances between 1964 and 2002). The changed title reflects the fact that Donald Duck is far more popular than Mickey Mouse in Sweden. The montage is narrated by Bengt Feldreich who translates character dialogue through voiceover dubs, and also replacing the original English voice of Jiminy Cricket (Cliff Edwards), including the performance of When You Wish Upon a Star.

The special, which is typically referred to as simply Kalle Anka (Donald Duck), along with its characters and cartoons, is ingrained in Swedish pop culture as a Christmas tradition. The popularity of Kalle Anka in Sweden as a television event was influenced by several factors, including the fact that for the ten years since the special's original premiere in 1960, SVT1 was the only television channel in the country (SVT2 launched in 1969), and even then, the country's public broadcaster Sveriges Television had a monopoly on television broadcasting until the 1987 launch of TV3, the country's first commercial channel. At the time, it was also one of the few occasions that U.S.-produced animation was broadcast on Swedish television. Kalle Anka has remained one of the most-watched television specials in the country; usually drawing more than five million viewers up until the 1990s, and still drawing 3.3 million viewers in 2019 (in a country with 8.5 and 10 million inhabitants in those years, respectively).

Due to its legacy and prominence, the special has remained relatively unchanged. The Swedish public has been protective of Kalle Anka, resisting any significant changes to the special's content: in the 1970s, when SVT's head of children's programming disclosed plans to discontinue the special due to growing anti-commercial sentiment in the country, public and tabloid outcry resulted in the special being maintained. A similar backlash was faced in 1982 when Ferdinand the Bull was replaced with The Ugly Duckling—a change that was reverted the following year. In 2012, Disney decided to edit the Santa's Workshop segment, removing "cultural stereotypes", that had been restored to the episode in 1983, provoking another public debate. As part of the 2021 broadcast, Disney introduced disclaimers to provide additional context for outdated cultural depictions.

The following shorts are usually shown, in integral or edited format:

Santa's Workshop
Clown of the Jungle
Pluto's Christmas Tree
Mickey's Trailer
Ferdinand the Bull

These feature films are represented through key scenes:

Snow White and the Seven Dwarfs
Cinderella
Lady and the Tramp
The Jungle Book
Robin Hood

One or two clips from new and upcoming Disney feature films are also shown, and change each year.

Russia 
In Russia, this show is called С Рождеством, от всего сердца! ("Merry Christmas With Whole Our Heart"). It was first broadcast on Channel One Russia on January 2, 2011 and was rerun on December 31, 2012. Since January 7, 2013 from January 7, 2021, it was shown on Disney Channel CIS each year, with nightly reruns showing throughout the first days of the New Year.

The Russian version features the following shorts:
Santa's Workshop (1932)
Pluto's Christmas Tree (1952)

As well as clips from the following feature films:
Peter Pan
Bambi
Pinocchio
Cinderella
Snow White and the Seven Dwarfs
The Little Mermaid
Beauty and the Beast

Two movies in the very end are different, depending on the year of the premiere.

2010
Toy Story 3
Tangled

2012
Brave
Secret of the Wings

2013
Frozen teaser trailer
Planes

2014
Big Hero 6
Frozen

2015
Inside Out
The Good Dinosaur

2016
Finding Dory
Moana

2017
Coco
Olaf's Frozen Adventure

2018
Incredibles 2
Ralph Breaks the Internet

2019
Frozen 2
Toy Story 4

2020
Onward
Soul

2022 (scraped due to shutdown of Disney channel CIS)
Strange World
Turning Red

France 
In France, the show is called Un Nouveau Noël Disney ("A New Disney Christmas") or Les Contes d'hiver de Jiminy Cricket ("Jiminy Cricket's Winter Tales"). It was broadcast on TF1 on December 23, 1990 as part of the "Disney Parade" program.

The French version features the following short:
Toy Tinkers (1949)

As well as clips from the following feature films:

Tron
Peter Pan
Bambi
Pinocchio
Lady and the Tramp
Cinderella
Snow White and the Seven Dwarfs
The Jungle Book
The Aristocats

See also 
A Disney Christmas Gift, another Disney Christmas special first broadcast in 1982
Dinner for One, a British sketch that has become a New Year's Eve tradition in Germany and other countries
Little Lord Fauntleroy (1980 film), a British family film that has become a Christmas classic in Germany
The Irony of Fate, a Soviet romantic comedy television film that is traditionally broadcast in Russia and most former Soviet republics every New Year's Eve.
The Snowman, an animated television special shown every Christmas in the United Kingdom since 1982
Tři oříšky pro Popelku, a Czechoslovak/East German fairy-tale film that is shown on TV around Christmas time every year in many European countries.

References

External links 

1958 television specials
1958 American television episodes
American Christmas television episodes
Walt Disney anthology television series episodes
Disney television specials
Christmas television specials
Nordic Christmas traditions
Slavic Christmas traditions
1950s American television specials
1958 in animation
American Christmas television specials